Mawugbe Atsu (born 20 August 1986) is a Togolese footballer. He currently plays for Maranatha F.C.

International career
Atsu earned his first call up for his country on 6 September 2009 for the World Cup Qualifying Match against Morocco national football team, who gave his debut for Togo.

References

External links

1986 births
Living people
Togolese footballers
Togo international footballers
Maranatha FC players
2013 Africa Cup of Nations players
Association football goalkeepers
21st-century Togolese people